Gum Creek is a historic home located near Columbia, Fluvanna County, Virginia.  It was built about 1797, and is a -story, three bay, center passage plan frame dwelling on a stone foundation.  Two one-story, shed roofed additions were built after 1839. It features unpainted original interior woodwork, a basement kitchen and stone and brick end chimneys. Also on the property are a contributing smokehouse, buggy shed, and the original stone-enclosed spring.

It was listed on the National Register of Historic Places in 2003.

References

Houses on the National Register of Historic Places in Virginia
Houses completed in 1797
Houses in Fluvanna County, Virginia
National Register of Historic Places in Fluvanna County, Virginia